This is a list of members of the 25th Legislative Assembly of Queensland from 1929 to 1932, as elected at the 1929 state election held on 11 May 1929.

  Irene Longman, the CPNP member for Bulimba, became the first female representative in the Queensland Parliament upon her defeat of Harry Wright at the 1929 election.
  On 16 September 1929, the Labor member for Burke, Darby Riordan, resigned to contest the 1929 federal election. Labor candidate Arthur Jones won the resulting by-election on 2 November 1929.
  On 22 September 1929, the Labor member for Maryborough, David Weir, died. CPNP candidate John Blackley won the resulting by-election on 26 October 1929.
  On 21 February 1930, the Labor member for Cairns and former Premier of Queensland, William McCormack, died. Labor candidate John O'Keefe won the resulting by-election on 10 May 1930.
  On 2 May 1930, the CPNP member for Fassifern, Ernest Bell, died. Independent candidate Arnold Wienholt won the resulting by-election on 28 June 1930.

See also
1929 Queensland state election
Moore Ministry (Queensland) (CPNP) (1929–1932)

References

 

Members of Queensland parliaments by term
20th-century Australian politicians